Elections to Lancashire County Council were held in May 1997 on the same day as the 1997 United Kingdom general election.

Results

Burnley

Chorley

Fylde

Hyndburn

Lancaster

Pendle

Preston

Ribble Valley

Rossendale

South Ribble

West Lancashire

Wyre

References

1997
1997 English local elections
1990s in Lancashire